Gustav Adolf Sjaastad (6 April 1902 – 7 May 1964) was a Norwegian lawyer and politician for the Labour Party. He served as Minister of Justice from 1954–1955 and Minister of Industry from 1955–1959, and also as County Governor of Nord-Trøndelag from 1959–1964.

Early life and career
He was born in Skogn as a son of farmer Olaf Herman Sjaastad (1869–1944) and Marta Fostad (1870–1933). He enrolled as a student in 1922, and graduated with the cand.jur. degree in 1926. He opened an attorney's office in Namsos in 1927. From 1933 he was a barrister, with access to work with Supreme Court cases. He was a member of the executive committee of Namsos municipal council from 1927 to 1934, representing the Liberal Party, whose local party chapter he chaired from 1927 to 1931.

In 1935 he opened a lawyer's office in Oslo. During World War II he was a member of the Norwegian resistance movement. He was arrested in December 1940 for "spying", and was imprisoned until May 1941 at Møllergata 19. In February 1944 he was arrested for the second time, this time for being involved in an illegal newspaper. He was imprisoned at Møllergata 19 again, before being transferred to Grini concentration camp, where he sat from May 1944 to the war's end on 8 May 1945.

Political career
From 1945 to 1954 he was a legal consultant for the Workers' National Trade Union (named Norwegian Confederation of Trade Unions from 1957). He also became a member of several public committees in 1946 and 1947, including Arbeidstvistkomiteen av 1946, Ferielovkomiteen and Pris- og rasjonaliseringskomiteen. From 1954 to 1955, during Torp's Cabinet, Sjaastad was the Minister of Justice. Upon the cabinet change to Gerhardsen's Third Cabinet in 1955, he became Minister of Industry and held that post until 1959. He was elected to the Parliament of Norway from Nord-Trøndelag in 1958, and until 1959 his seat in parliament was taken by Hans Mikal Solsem. Sjaastad was not re-elected in 1961. His career ended with the post of County Governor of Nord-Trøndelag, which he held from 1959 to 1964. He died in May 1964.

Sjaastad was a member of the board of Nord-Trøndelag Elektrisitetsverk from 1959 to 1964, Norsk Hydro from 1946 to 1955, Folla from 1959 to 1964, Mosjøen Veveri from 1960 to 1964 and Det Norske Teatret. He was chairman of the board of Fylkesbilene from 1959 to 1964 and Tiden Norsk Forlag from 1947 to 1954. He was decorated as a Commander of the Order of the Polar Star in 1960.

References

1902 births
1964 deaths
People from Namsos
People from Levanger
20th-century Norwegian lawyers
Norwegian resistance members
Grini concentration camp survivors
Liberal Party (Norway) politicians
Labour Party (Norway) politicians
Politicians from Nord-Trøndelag
Government ministers of Norway
Members of the Storting
County governors of Norway
Norwegian trade unionists
Order of the Polar Star
20th-century Norwegian politicians
Ministers of Justice of Norway
Ministers of Trade and Shipping of Norway